Seymour Victory Reit (11 November 1918 – 21 November 2001) was an American author of over 80 children's books as well as several works for adults.  Reit was the creator, with cartoonist Joe Oriolo, of the character Casper the Friendly Ghost. Reit started his career working for Fleischer Studios as an animator; he also worked for Jerry Iger and Will Eisner as a cartoonist, for Laffboy as editor in 1965, and for Mad Magazine and several other publications as a humorist.

Biography
Reit was born in New York City on 11 November 1918 (Armistice Day).  He attended DeWitt Clinton High School and New York University, where he drew cartoons for humorous college magazines. He worked as an in-betweener and inker on the 1939 animated film Gulliver's Travels, and later became a gag writer for the Popeye and Betty Boop cartoon series, among others.  He also anonymously produced comic strips for Jerry Iger under the Fiction House label.<ref
name="guardian_obit"/> He attended New York University with future Captain Marvel writer William Woolfolk; and helped launch Woolfolk's career as a writer of comics by introducing him to Jerry Iger and Will Eisner.

Reit served in World War II in a U.S. Army Air Force camouflage unit tasked with defending the West Coast from a Japanese invasion, and later served in Europe after D-Day.  He later wrote a book, The Amazing Camouflage Deceptions of World War II, drawing on his wartime experience. It contains a version of the urban legend which claims that British aviators taunted the German Army by dropping a wooden bomb on a decoy airfield the Germans had built.

After the war, Reit did cartoon work for Archie and Little Lulu, and wrote gags for some of the new Casper animated shorts that were being produced.  He also wrote for the TV series Captain Kangaroo.  In 1950 he started working for the publications department of the Bank Street College of Education in New York, and also scripted industrial films and radio shows.  In the late 1950s, he began submitting work to Mad Magazine, ultimately contributing over 60 pieces.  One of Reit's articles for Mad, "The 'Down-To-Earth' Coloring Book," appeared in the summer of 1960 and anticipated (or helped inspire) the faddish publishing boom of "adult" coloring books.

Books
Reit wrote over 80 books, primarily for children, on a variety of historical, technical, natural, and other subjects. One of his titles for adults, The Day They Stole the Mona Lisa, written in 1981, is about the theft of the Mona Lisa from the Louvre in 1911.  In the book, Reit asserted that there were two genuine Mona Lisas in the world: the one in the Louvre, and an earlier version of the work painted by Leonardo da Vinci which was being held in a bank vault in New Jersey (the so-called "Vernon Mona Lisa").  A long-planned movie adaptation of the book has never materialized, although the Internet Movie Database lists a movie by the same title that had tentatively been planned for 2009.

Selected works

In addition to those listed here, Reit wrote several books for Golden Press, publishers of the Little Golden Books series, and dozens of other children's books for assorted publishers.

References

External links
 Lambiek Comiclopedia article.
 Author "Seymour Reit" at Google Book Search
 MAD Magazine Contributions by Sy Reit 
 
 

1918 births
2001 deaths
American comics writers
American comics artists
American children's writers
American animators
American cartoonists
Writers from New York (state)
New York University alumni
DeWitt Clinton High School alumni
20th-century American screenwriters